The Walk is a 2022 period drama film based on true events about Boston's 1974 desegregation busing. Directed by Daniel Adams from a script he co-wrote with George Powell, the film stars Justin Chatwin, Terrence Howard, Jeremy Piven, Lovie Simone and Malcolm McDowell.

Plot
Set in 1974 Boston, the film centers on police officer Bill Coughlin, who is tasked to protect a couple of black students as they are bussed into an all-white high school, Coughlin being also under the pressure of a local crime boss. In the same time, Wendy Robbins, a 18-year-old student and her father Lamont, are caught in the middle of some violent protests on the streets, while Kate, Bill's teenage daughter, is faced with her own racist attitude.

Cast
 Justin Chatwin as Bill Coughlin
 Terrence Howard as Lamont Robbins
 Jeremy Piven as Johnny Bunkley
 Lovie Simone as Wendy Robbins
 Malcolm McDowell as McLaughlin
 Katie Douglas as Kate Coughlin
 Sally Kirkland as Mrs. Kelley
 Jay Huguley as Riley
 Anastasiya Mitrunen
 Jim Gleason
 Maggie Wagner
 Jason Alan Smith
 Tedrick Martin as Riot Cop

Production
On November 13, 2019, it was announced that Daniel Adams will be directing the film from a screenplay he co-wrote with first-time screenwriter George Powell. In April 2021, Justin Chatwin confirmed that he will star in the film. In July 2021, Terrence Howard, Jeremy Piven, Lovie Simone, Malcolm McDowell, Katie Douglas, Jay Huguley, Sally Kirkland, Anastasiya Mitrunen, Jim Gleason, and Maggie Wagner were officially confirmed to be part of the cast.

Principal photography began in New Orleans, Louisiana on June 13, 2021, and concluded on July 12, 2021.

Release
In March 2022, it was announced that Vertical Entertainment had acquired U.S. distribution rights to the film. It was released in theaters and through video on demand in the United States on June 10, 2022.

References

External links
 

American films based on actual events
American independent films
Drama films based on actual events
Fictional portrayals of the Boston Police Department
Films about race and ethnicity
Films about racism in the United States
Films directed by Daniel Adams (director)
Films set in 1974
Films set in Boston
Films shot in New Orleans
2020s English-language films
2020s American films